Lachlan (or Lauchlan) Mackinnon (or MacKinnon or McKinnon) may refer to:
 Sir Lachlan Mackinnon (clan chief) (died c.1634), chief of the Scottish Highland clan Mackinnon
 Lauchlan Bellingham Mackinnon (1814–1877), Member of Parliament for Rye, Sussex, England
 Lauchlan Mackinnon (1817–1888), an Australian pastoralist, politician and newspaper proprietor
 Lachlan Donald Ian Mackinnon (1882–1948), a Royal Navy officer
 Lachlan Mackinnon (born 1956), a Scottish poet, critic and literary journalist